This is a list of colonial governors and administrators in the Gambia from the establishment of a British settlement on St Mary's Island, now known as Banjul Island, in 1816, through to the Gambia Colony and Protectorate's independence from the United Kingdom in 1965.

The official title of the Commandant of St Mary's Island was given as the Commandant of the British Settlement at St Mary's in 1823. In 1821, the Gambia became a British colony that formed part of Sierra Leone. In 1829, a Lieutenant Governor was appointed that was subordinate to the Governor of Sierra Leone. Between 1843 and 1866, the Gambia had its own Governor independent of Sierra Leone. It once again became subordinate in 1866, with an Administrator being appointed to govern the territory. An independent Governor was again appointed in 1901 that also acted as the Commander-in-Chief of the colony.

The Gambia achieved independence in 1965. Thereafter, the viceroy of the British Crown in the Gambia became the Governor-General of the Gambia, until it renounced the Queen as head of state in 1970.

Before 1816
Before 1816, the colonial presence in the Gambia was restricted to James Island (known as St Andrew's Island from 1456 to 1660, and as Kunta Kinteh Island since 2011).

Commandants of St Mary's Island (1816–1830)

Lieutenant Governors of the Gambia (1830–1843)

Governors of the Gambia (1843–1866)

Administrators of the Gambia (1866–1901)

Governors of the Gambia (1901–1965)

See also

History of the Gambia
List of heads of state of the Gambia
List of heads of government of the Gambia
Lists of office-holders

Notes
 This incumbent was acting in this position in the place of a formally-appointed incumbent.
 Elizabeth II remained as monarch of The Gambia from 1965 to 1970 in her capacity as Queen of the Gambia.

References

History of the Gambia
Gambia, The